James R. "Pete" Willett was an American athlete who played baseball as an infielder in the Negro leagues and basketball. He played baseball with several teams from 1923 to 1928.

Athletic career
Willett attended Central High School in Cleveland, Ohio, and also played football, basketball and ran track for Wilberforce University in 1922 to 1924.

In 1923, Willett played baseball with the Buffalo Colored Giants, and also played with the Lincoln Giants of the Eastern Colored League. He spent time with the independent Dayton Marcos in 1924, before playing with the Cleveland Browns. In June 1925, he was acquired by the Homestead Grays to fill in for injured players. In September 1925, he played with the Pullman Colored Giants of Buffalo. In 1926, he saw time with the Brown's Stars of Youngstown, Ohio, and the Cleveland Elites. Willett later played in 25 recorded games with the Cleveland Tigers of the Negro National League in 1928. He also appeared with the Cleveland Oaks and Cleveland Pyramids in 1928.

Outside of baseball, he captained and coached the Benjee Drugs basketball team in 1925 and 1926. Willett also played with the Cleveland Elks in 1926 and 1927, and the Loendi Big Five in 1927 and 1928.

On February 10, 1927, Willett dislocated his knee and two other Elks players were seriously injured after their car went into a ditch and overturned multiple times near London, Ohio.

References

External links
 and Seamheads

Cleveland Browns (baseball) players
Cleveland Elites players
Cleveland Tigers (baseball) players
Dayton Marcos players
Homestead Grays players
Lincoln Giants players
Wilberforce University alumni
Year of birth unknown
Year of death unknown
20th-century African-American sportspeople
Baseball shortstops
Baseball third basemen
African-American basketball players
American men's basketball players
Baseball players from Cleveland